Prince Albert Victor, Duke of Clarence and Avondale (Albert Victor Christian Edward; 8 January 1864 – 14 January 1892) was the eldest child of the Prince and Princess of Wales (later King Edward VII and Queen Alexandra) and grandson of the reigning British monarch, Queen Victoria. From the time of his birth, he was second in the line of succession to the British throne, but did not become king or Prince of Wales because he died before both his grandmother and his father.

Albert Victor was known to his family, and many later biographers, as "Eddy". When young, he travelled the world extensively as a naval cadet, and as an adult he joined the British Army but did not undertake any active military duties. After two unsuccessful courtships, he became engaged to be married to Princess Victoria Mary of Teck in late 1891. A few weeks later, he died during a major pandemic. Mary later married his younger brother, who eventually became King George V in 1910.

Albert Victor's intellect, sexuality, and mental health have been the subject of speculation. Rumours in his time linked him with the Cleveland Street scandal, which involved a homosexual brothel; however, there is no conclusive evidence that he ever went there, or was indeed homosexual. Some authors have argued that he was the serial killer known as Jack the Ripper, or that he was otherwise involved in the murders, but contemporaneous documents show that Albert Victor could not have been in London at the time of the murders, and the claim is widely dismissed.

Early life

Albert Victor was born two months prematurely on 8 January 1864 at Frogmore House, Windsor, Berkshire. He was the first child of Albert Edward, Prince of Wales, and his wife Alexandra of Denmark. Following his grandmother Queen Victoria's wishes, he was named Albert Victor, after herself and her late husband, Albert. As a grandchild of the reigning British monarch in the male line and a son of the Prince of Wales, he was formally styled His Royal Highness Prince Albert Victor of Wales from birth. He was christened Albert Victor Christian Edward in the private chapel of Buckingham Palace on 10 March 1864 by the Archbishop of Canterbury, Charles Longley, but was known informally as "Eddy".

Education 

When Albert Victor was just short of seventeen months old, his brother, Prince George of Wales, was born on 3 June 1865. Given the closeness in age of the two royal brothers, they were educated together. In 1871, the Queen appointed John Neale Dalton as their tutor. The two princes were given a strict programme of study, which included games and military drills as well as academic subjects. Dalton complained that Albert Victor's mind was "abnormally dormant". 

Though he learned to speak Danish, progress in other languages and subjects was slow. Sir Henry Ponsonby thought that Albert Victor might have inherited his mother's deafness. Albert Victor never excelled intellectually. Possible physical explanations for Albert Victor's inattention or indolence in class include absence seizures or his premature birth, which can be associated with learning difficulties, but Lady Geraldine Somerset blamed Albert Victor's poor education on Dalton, whom she considered uninspiring.

Separating the brothers for the remainder of their education was considered, but Dalton advised the Prince of Wales against splitting them up as "Prince Albert Victor requires the stimulus of Prince George's company to induce him to work at all." In 1877, the two boys were sent to the Royal Navy's training ship, HMS Britannia. They began their studies there two months behind the other cadets as Albert Victor contracted typhoid fever, for which he was treated by Sir William Gull. Dalton accompanied them as chaplain to the ship.

In 1879, after a great deal of discussion between the Queen, the Prince of Wales, their households and the Government, the royal brothers were sent as naval cadets on a three-year world tour aboard HMS Bacchante. Albert Victor was rated midshipman on his sixteenth birthday. They toured the British Empire, accompanied by Dalton, visiting the Americas, the Falkland Islands, South Africa, Australia, Fiji, the Far East, Singapore, Ceylon, Aden, Egypt, the Holy Land and Greece. They acquired tattoos in Japan. By the time they returned to Britain, Albert Victor was eighteen.

The brothers were parted in 1883; George continued in the navy and Albert Victor attended Trinity College, Cambridge. At Bachelor's Cottage, Sandringham, Albert Victor was expected to cram before arriving at university in the company of Dalton, French instructor Monsieur Hua, and a newly chosen tutor/companion, James Kenneth Stephen. Some biographers have said that Stephen was a misogynist, although this has recently been questioned, and he may have felt emotionally attached to Albert Victor, but whether or not his feelings were overtly homosexual is open to question. Stephen was initially optimistic about tutoring the prince, but by the time the party were to move to Cambridge had concluded, "I do not think he can possibly derive much benefit from attending lectures at Cambridge ... He hardly knows the meaning of the words to read".

At the start of the new term in October, Albert Victor, Dalton, and Lieutenant Henderson  from Bacchante moved to Nevile's Court at Trinity College, which was generally reserved for accommodating dons rather than students. The prince showed little interest in the intellectual atmosphere, and he was excused from examinations, though he did become involved in undergraduate life. He was introduced to Oscar Browning, a noted don who gave parties and "made pets of those undergraduates who were handsome and attractive", and became friendly with Dalton's godson, Alfred Fripp, who later became his doctor and royal surgeon. It is not known whether he had any sexual experiences at Cambridge, but partners of either sex would have been available. In August 1884, he spent some time at Heidelberg University studying German, before returning to Cambridge. Leaving Cambridge in 1885, where he had already served as a cadet in the 2nd Cambridge University Battalion, he was gazetted as an officer in the 10th Hussars. In 1888, he was awarded an honorary degree by the university.

One of Albert Victor's instructors said he learnt by listening rather than reading or writing and had no difficulty remembering information, but Prince George, Duke of Cambridge, had a less favourable opinion of him, calling him "an inveterate and incurable dawdler". Princess Augusta of Cambridge was also dismissive, calling him: "si peu de chose" [such a small thing]. 

Much of Albert Victor's time at his post in Aldershot was spent drilling, which he disliked, though he did like to play polo. He passed his examinations, and in March 1887, he was posted to Hounslow where he was promoted to captain. He was given more public engagements, visited Ireland and Gibraltar, and opened the Hammersmith suspension bridge. Of his private life, a childhood friend of Albert Victor later recalled that it was uneventful: "his brother officers had said that they would like to make a man of the world of him. Into that world he refused to be initiated."

Cleveland Street scandal

In July 1889, the Metropolitan Police uncovered a male brothel operated by Charles Hammond in London's Cleveland Street. Under police interrogation, the male prostitutes and pimps revealed the names of their clients, who included Lord Arthur Somerset, an Extra Equerry to the Prince of Wales. At the time, all homosexual acts between men were illegal, and the clients faced social ostracism, prosecution, and at worst, two years' imprisonment with hard labour.

The resultant Cleveland Street scandal implicated other high-ranking figures in British society, and rumours swept upper-class London of the involvement of a member of the royal family, namely Prince Albert Victor. The prostitutes had not named Albert Victor, and it is suggested that Somerset's solicitor, Arthur Newton, fabricated and spread the rumours to take the heat off his client. Letters exchanged between the Treasury Solicitor, Sir Augustus Stephenson, and his assistant, Hamilton Cuffe, make coded reference to Newton's threats to implicate Albert Victor.

In December 1889, it was reported that the Prince and Princess of Wales were "daily assailed with anonymous letters of the most outrageous character" bearing upon the scandal. The Prince of Wales intervened in the investigation; no clients were ever prosecuted and nothing against Albert Victor was proven. Sir Charles Russell was retained to watch the proceedings in the case on behalf of Albert Victor. Although there is no conclusive evidence for or against his involvement, or that he ever visited a homosexual club or brothel, the rumours and cover-up have led some biographers to speculate that he did visit Cleveland Street, and that he was "possibly bisexual, probably homosexual". This is contested by other commentators, one of whom refers to him as "ardently heterosexual" and his involvement in the rumours as "somewhat unfair". The historian H. Montgomery Hyde wrote, "There is no evidence that he was homosexual, or even bisexual."

While English newspapers suppressed mention of the Prince's name in association with the case, Welsh-language, colonial, and American newspapers were less inhibited. The New York Times ridiculed him as a "dullard" and "stupid perverse boy", who would "never be allowed to ascend the British throne". According to one American press report, when departing the Gare du Nord in Paris in May 1890, Albert Victor was cheered by a waiting crowd of English, but hissed and catcalled by some of the French; one journalist present asked him if he would comment "as to the cause of his sudden departure from England". According to the report, "The Prince's sallow face turned scarlet and his eyes seemed to start from their orbits," and he had one of his companions upbraid the fellow for impertinence.

Somerset's sister, Lady Waterford, denied that her brother knew anything about Albert Victor. She wrote, "I am sure the boy is as straight as a line ... Arthur does not the least know how or where the boy spends his time ... he believes the boy to be perfectly innocent." Lady Waterford also believed Somerset's protestations of his own innocence. In surviving private letters to his friend Lord Esher, Somerset denies knowing anything directly about Albert Victor, but confirms that he has heard the rumours, and hopes that they will help quash any prosecution. He wrote,
I can quite understand the Prince of Wales being much annoyed at his son's name being coupled with the thing but that was the case before I left it ... we were both accused of going to this place but not together ... they will end by having out in open court exactly what they are all trying to keep quiet. I wonder if it is really a fact or only an invention of that arch ruffian H[ammond].
He continued,I have never mentioned the boy's name except to Probyn, Montagu and Knollys when they were acting for me and I thought they ought to know. Had they been wise, hearing what I knew and therefore what others knew, they ought to have hushed the matter up, instead of stirring it up as they did, with all the authorities.
The rumours persisted; sixty years later the official biographer of George V, Harold Nicolson, was told by Lord Goddard, who was a twelve-year-old schoolboy at the time of the scandal, that Albert Victor "had been involved in a male brothel scene, and that a solicitor had to commit perjury to clear him. The solicitor was struck off the rolls for his offence, but was thereafter reinstated." In fact, none of the lawyers in the case was convicted of perjury or struck off during the scandal, but Somerset's solicitor, Arthur Newton, was convicted of obstruction of justice for helping his clients escape abroad, and was sentenced to six weeks in prison. Over twenty years later in 1910, Newton was struck off for twelve months for professional misconduct after falsifying letters from another of his clients, the notorious murderer Dr Crippen. In 1913, Newton was struck off indefinitely and sentenced to three years' imprisonment for obtaining money by false pretences.

Tour of India

The foreign press suggested that Albert Victor was sent on a seven-month tour of British India from October 1889 to avoid the gossip which swept London society in the wake of the scandal. This is not true; the trip had actually been planned since the spring. Travelling via Athens, Port Said, Cairo and Aden, Albert Victor arrived in Bombay on 9 November 1889. He was entertained sumptuously in Hyderabad by the Nizam, and elsewhere by many other maharajahs. In Bangalore he laid the foundation stone of the Glass House at the Lalbagh Botanical Gardens on 30 November 1889. He spent Christmas at Mandalay and the New Year at Calcutta. Most of the extensive travelling was done by train, although elephants were ridden as part of ceremonies. In the style of the time, a great many animals were shot for sport.

During the trip, Albert Victor met Mrs. Margery Haddon, the wife of a civil engineer, Henry Haddon. After several failed marriages and Albert Victor's death, Margery came to England and claimed the Prince was the father of her son, Clarence Haddon. There was no evidence and her claims were dismissed. She had become an alcoholic and seemed deranged. The allegations were reported to Buckingham Palace and the head of the police Special Branch investigated. Papers in The National Archives show that neither courtiers nor Margery had any proof to support the allegation. In a statement to police, Albert Victor's lawyers admitted that there had been "some relations" between him and Mrs. Haddon, but denied the claim of fatherhood.

In the 1920s, however, the son, Clarence, repeated the story and published a book in the United States, My Uncle George V, in which he claimed he was born in London in September 1890, about nine months after Albert Victor's meeting with Mrs. Haddon. In 1933, he was charged with demanding money with menace and attempted extortion after writing to the King asking for hush money. At his trial the following January, the prosecution produced documents showing that Haddon's enlistment papers, marriage certificate, officer's commission, demobilisation papers and employment records all showed he was born in or before 1887, at least two years before Albert Victor met Mrs. Haddon. Haddon was found guilty and the judge, believing Haddon to be suffering from delusions, did not imprison him but bound him over for three years on the condition that he made no claim that he was Albert Victor's son. Haddon breached the conditions and was incarcerated for a year. Dismissed as a crank, he died a broken man. Even if Haddon's claim had been true, as with other illegitimate births it would have made no difference to the royal line of succession.

On his return from India, Albert Victor was created Duke of Clarence and Avondale and Earl of Athlone on 24 May 1890, Queen Victoria's 71st birthday.

Potential brides

In 1889, Albert Victor's grandmother Queen Victoria expressed her wish that he marry his paternal cousin Princess Alix of Hesse and by Rhine, who was one of her favorite granddaughters. In Balmoral Castle, he proposed to Alix, but she did not return his affections and refused his offer of engagement. He persisted in trying to convince Alix to marry him, but he finally gave up in 1890 when she sent him a letter in which she told him "how it grieves her to pain him, but that she cannot marry him, much as she likes him as a Cousin." In 1894, she married Tsar Nicholas II of Russia, another of Albert Victor's cousins.

After her proposed match with Alix fell through, Victoria suggested to Albert Victor that he marry another first cousin, Princess Margaret of Prussia. On 19 May 1890, she sent him a formal letter in which she expressed her opinions about Margaret's suitability to become Queen: "Of the few possible Princess (for of course any Lady in Society would never do) I think no one more likely to suit you and the position better than your Cousin Mossy  ... She is not regularly pretty but she has a very pretty figure, is very amiable and half English with great love for England which you will find in very few if any others." Although Albert Victor's father approved, Queen Victoria's secretary Henry Ponsonby informed her that Albert Victor's mother "would object most strongly and indeed has already done so." Nothing came of Queen Victoria's suggestion.

By this time however, Albert Victor was falling in love with Princess Hélène of Orléans, a daughter of Prince Philippe, Count of Paris, a pretender to the French throne who was living in England after being banished from France in 1886. At first, Queen Victoria opposed any engagement because Hélène was Roman Catholic. Once Albert Victor and Hélène confided their love to her, the Queen relented and supported the proposed marriage. Hélène offered to convert to the Church of England, and Albert Victor offered to renounce his succession rights to marry her. 

To the couple's disappointment, her father refused to countenance the marriage and was adamant she could not convert. Hélène travelled personally to intercede with Pope Leo XIII, but he confirmed her father's verdict, and the courtship ended. When Albert Victor died, his sisters Maud and Louise sympathized with Hélène and treated her, not his fiancée Princess Victoria Mary of Teck, as his true love. Maud told her that "he is buried with your little coin around his neck" and Louise said that he is "yours in death". Hélène later became Duchess of Aosta.

By 1891, another potential bride, Princess Victoria Mary of Teck, was under consideration. Mary was the daughter of Queen Victoria's first cousin Princess Mary Adelaide, Duchess of Teck. Queen Victoria was very supportive, considering Mary ideal—charming, sensible and pretty. On 3 December 1891 Albert Victor, to Mary's "great surprise", proposed to her at Luton Hoo, the country residence of the Danish ambassador to Britain. The wedding was set for 27 February 1892.

Personal life
In 1891, Albert Victor wrote to Lady Sybil St Clair Erskine that he was in love once again, though he does not say with whom. A week after the first letter, he asked Erskine, "I wonder if you really love me a little? ...  I should be very pleased if you did just a little bit."

In late 1891, the Prince was implicated as having been involved with a former Gaiety Theatre chorus girl, Lydia Miller (stage name Lydia Manton), who committed suicide by drinking carbolic acid. Although she was the nominal mistress of Lord Charles Montagu, who gave evidence at the inquest, it was alleged that he was merely a cover for the Prince, who had requested she give up her theatrical career on his behalf, and that the authorities sought to suppress the case by making the inquest private and refusing access to the depositions. Similarly to the Cleveland Street scandal, only overseas newspapers printed Albert Victor's name, but regional British newspapers did quote the radical London newspaper The Star which published: "It is a fact so well known that the blind denials of it given in some quarters are childishly futile. Lydia Manton was the petite amie of a certain young prince, and that, too, quite recently." It was labelled "a scandal of the first magnitude ... on the lips of every clubman", and compared to the Tranby Croft affair, in which his father was called to give evidence at a trial for slander.

Rumours also surfaced in 1900, after Albert Victor's death, of his association with another former Gaiety girl, Maude Richardson (birth name: Louisa Lancey), and that the royal family had attempted to pay her off. In 2002, letters purported to have been sent by Albert Victor to his solicitor referring to a payoff made to Richardson of £200 were sold at Bonhams auction house in London. Owing to discrepancies in the dates and spelling of the letters, one historian has suggested they could be forgeries.

In mid-1890, Albert Victor was attended by several doctors. In Albert Victor's and other correspondence, his illness is only referred to as "fever" or "gout". Some biographers have assumed he was suffering from "a mild form of venereal disease", perhaps gonorrhea, which he may have suffered from on an earlier occasion, but the exact nature of his illness is unknown. Letters dated 1885 and 1886 from Albert Victor to his doctor at Aldershot (known only as "Roche") detail that he was taking medicine for 'glete' (gleet), then a term for gonorrhea discharge.

Death

Just as plans for both his marriage to Mary and his appointment as Viceroy of Ireland were under discussion, Albert Victor fell ill with influenza in the pandemic of 1889–1892. He developed pneumonia and died at Sandringham House in Norfolk on 14 January 1892, less than a week after his 28th birthday.

His parents the Prince and Princess of Wales, his sisters Princesses Maud and Victoria, his brother Prince George, his fiancée Princess Mary, her parents the Duke and Duchess of Teck, three physicians (Alan Reeve Manby, Francis Laking and William Broadbent) and three nurses were present. The Prince of Wales's chaplain, Canon Frederick Hervey, stood over Albert Victor reading prayers for the dying.

The nation was shocked. Shops put up their shutters. The Prince of Wales wrote to Queen Victoria, "Gladly would I have given my life for his". Princess Mary wrote to Queen Victoria of the Princess of Wales, "the despairing look on her face was the most heart-rending thing I have ever seen." His younger brother Prince George wrote, "how deeply I did love him; & I remember with pain nearly every hard word & little quarrel I ever had with him & I long to ask his forgiveness, but, alas, it is too late now!" George took Albert Victor's place in the line of succession, eventually succeeding to the throne as George V in 1910. Drawn together during their shared period of mourning, Prince George later married Mary himself in 1893. She became queen consort on George's accession.

Albert Victor's mother, Alexandra, never fully recovered from her son's death and kept the room in which he died as a shrine. At the funeral, Mary laid her bridal wreath of orange blossom upon the coffin. James Kenneth Stephen, Albert Victor's former tutor, refused all food from the day of Albert Victor's death and died 20 days later; he had suffered a head injury in 1886 which left him suffering from psychosis. The Prince is buried in the Albert Memorial Chapel close to St George's Chapel, Windsor Castle. His tomb, by Alfred Gilbert, is "the finest single example of late 19th-century sculpture in the British Isles". A recumbent effigy of the Prince in a Hussar uniform (almost impossible to see properly in situ) lies above the tomb. Kneeling over him is an angel, holding a heavenly crown. The tomb is surrounded by an elaborate railing, with figures of saints. The perfectionist Gilbert spent too much on the commission, went bankrupt, and left the country. Five of the smaller figures were only completed with "a greater roughness and pittedness of texture" after his return to Britain in the 1920s.

One obituary, written by a journalist who claimed to have attended the majority of Albert Victor's public appearances, stated:
He was little known personally to the English public. His absence at sea, and on travels and duty with his regiment, kept him out of the general eye ... at times, there was a sallowness of hue, which much increased the grave aspect ... not only in the metropolis, but throughout the country, somehow, it was always said, 'He will never come to the throne.

Legacy

During his life, the bulk of the British press treated Albert Victor with nothing but respect and the eulogies that immediately followed his death were full of praise. The radical politician Henry Broadhurst, who had met both Albert Victor and his brother George, noted that they had "a total absence of affectation or haughtiness". On the day of Albert Victor's death, the leading Liberal politician, William Ewart Gladstone, wrote in his personal private diary "a great loss to our party". However, Queen Victoria referred to Albert Victor's "dissipated life" in private letters to her eldest daughter, which were later published. 

In the mid-20th century, the official biographers of Queen Mary and King George V, James Pope-Hennessy and Harold Nicolson respectively, promoted hostile assessments of Albert Victor's life, portraying him as lazy, ill-educated and physically feeble. The exact nature of his "dissipations" is not clear, but in 1994 Theo Aronson favoured the theory on "admittedly circumstantial" evidence that the "unspecified 'dissipations' were predominantly homosexual". Aronson's judgement was based on Albert Victor's "adoration of his elegant and possessive mother; his 'want of manliness'; his 'shrinking from horseplay'; [and] his 'sweet, gentle, quiet and charming' nature", as well as the Cleveland Street rumours and his opinion that there is "a certain amount of homosexuality in all men". He admitted, however, that "the allegations of Prince Eddy's homosexuality must be treated cautiously."

Rumours that Prince Albert Victor may have committed, or been responsible for, the Jack the Ripper murders were first mentioned in print in 1962. It was later alleged, among others by Stephen Knight in Jack the Ripper: The Final Solution, that Albert Victor fathered a child with a woman in the Whitechapel district of London, and either he or several high-ranking men committed the murders in an effort to cover up his indiscretion. Though such claims have been repeated frequently, scholars have dismissed them as fantasies, and refer to indisputable proof of the Prince's innocence. 

For example, on 30 September 1888, when Elizabeth Stride and Catherine Eddowes were murdered in London, Albert Victor was over 500 miles (over 800 km) away at Balmoral, the royal retreat in Scotland, in the presence of Queen Victoria, other family members, visiting German royalty and a large number of staff. According to the official Court Circular, family journals and letters, newspaper reports and other sources, he could not have been near any of the murders. Other fanciful conspiracy theories are that he died of syphilis or poison, that he was pushed off a cliff on the instructions of Lord Randolph Churchill, or that his death was faked to remove him from the line of succession.

Albert Victor's posthumous reputation became so bad that in 1964 Philip Magnus called his death a "merciful act of providence", supporting the theory that his death removed an unsuitable heir to the throne and replaced him with the reliable and sober George V. In 1972, Michael Harrison was the first modern author to re-assess Albert Victor and portray him in a more sympathetic light. Biographer Andrew Cook continued attempts to rehabilitate Albert Victor's reputation, arguing that his lack of academic progress was partly due to the incompetence of his tutor, Dalton; that he was a warm and charming man; that there is no tangible evidence that he was homosexual or bisexual; that he held liberal views, particularly on Irish Home Rule; and that his reputation was diminished by biographers eager to improve the image of his brother, George.

Fictional portrayals
The conspiracy theories surrounding Albert Victor have led to his portrayal in film as somehow responsible for or involved in the Jack the Ripper murders. Bob Clark's Sherlock Holmes mystery Murder by Decree was released in 1979 with "Duke of Clarence (Eddy)" played by Robin Marchal. Jack the Ripper was released in 1988 with Marc Culwick as Prince Albert Victor. Samuel West played "Prince Eddy" in The Ripper (1997), having previously played Albert Victor as a child in the 1975 TV miniseries Edward the Seventh. 

Older versions of Albert Victor in Edward the Seventh are played by Jerome Watts and Charles Dance. From 1989 to 1998 Alan Moore and Eddie Campbell published the graphic novel From Hell in serialized form, which is based on Stephen Knight's theory. It was adapted into a 2001 film of the same name by the Hughes brothers. Mark Dexter portrayed both "Prince Edward" and "Albert Sickert". The story, based largely on the same sources as Murder by Decree, is also the basis for the play Force and Hypocrisy by Doug Lucie.

A pair of alternative history novels King and Joker (1976) and Skeleton in Waiting (1990), written by Peter Dickinson, are the adventures of a  fictitious royal family descended from an Albert Victor who survived and reigned as King Victor I. In Gary Lovisi's parallel universe Sherlock Holmes pastiche, "The Adventure of the Missing Detective" in Sherlock Holmes: The Hidden Years, Albert Victor is portrayed as a tyrannical king, who rules after the deaths (in suspicious circumstances) of both his grandmother and father. The Prince also appears as the murder victim in the first of the Lord Francis Powerscourt crime novels Goodnight Sweet Prince, and as a murder suspect in the novel Death at Glamis Castle by Robin Paige. 

In both The Bloody Red Baron (volume 2 of Anno Dracula series) by Kim Newman and the novel I, Vampire by Michael Romkey, he has become a vampire. In the former, he is the British monarch during the First World War. The Prince of Mirrors by Alan Robert Clark is a historical novel which closely follows the factual trajectory of Albert Victor's documented life, and imaginatively interweaves how that life might have been emotionally. Two DC Comics series published as part of its Elseworlds imprint feature Prince Albert ("Eddy") as a minor character: Gotham by Gaslight and Wonder Woman: Amazonia.

Titles, styles, honours and arms

Titles and styles
8 January 1864 – 24 May 1890: His Royal Highness Prince Albert Victor of Wales
24 May 1890 – 14 January 1892: His Royal Highness The Duke of Clarence and Avondale
The Duke of Clarence's full style, as proclaimed at his funeral by Garter King of Arms, was: "[the] Most High, Mighty, and Illustrious Prince Albert Victor Christian Edward, Duke of Clarence and Avondale, Earl of Athlone, Duke of Saxony, Prince of Saxe-Coburg and Gotha, Knight of the Most Noble Order of the Garter, Knight of the Most Illustrious Order of Saint Patrick".

Honours
British honours
KG: Royal Knight of the Most Noble Order of the Garter, 3 September 1883
KP: Extra Knight of the Most Illustrious Order of Saint Patrick, 28 June 1887
ADC: Personal Aide-de-Camp to the Queen, 21 June 1887
LLD: Doctor of Laws, University of Dublin, 1887
LLD: Doctor of Laws, University of Cambridge, 1888
Sub-Prior of the Venerable Order of Saint John of Jerusalem, 1888

Foreign honours
 Grand Cross of the Order of the Netherlands Lion
 Grand Cross of the Royal Military Order of the Tower and Sword, 5 March 1885
 Grand Cross of the Royal and Distinguished Order of Charles III, with Collar, 23 January 1885
 Order of Osmanieh, 1st Class in Diamonds
 Grand Cross of the Order of the Star of Romania
 Knight of the Supreme Order of the Most Holy Annunciation, 8 January 1885
 Grand Cross of the Order of the Southern Cross
   Grand Cross of the Saxe-Ernestine House Order, 1883
 Grand Cross of the Grand Ducal Hessian Order of Ludwig, 30 April 1884
 Grand Cross of the Order of the White Falcon, 1885
 Knight of the Order of the Elephant, 11 October 1883
  Knight of the Royal Order of the Seraphim, 8 January 1885
 Knight of the Order of the Black Eagle, 8 January 1885
 Grand Cordon of the Order of Leopold, 1885
  Grand Cross of the Royal Hungarian Order of Saint Stephen, 1887

Military

1877–1879: Cadet aboard training ship HMS Britannia, Dartmouth, Devon
1879–1880: Cadet, HMS Bacchante
Mid, 1880–1883: Promoted to Midshipman, HMS Bacchante
Lt, 1886–1887: Appointed Lieutenant, 10th (Prince of Wales' Own) Royal Hussars
Capt, 1887: Promoted to Captain, 9th Queen's Royal Lancers
Capt, 1887–1889: Captain, 3rd King's Royal Rifle Corps
Maj, 1889–1892: Major, 10th (Prince of Wales' Own) Royal Hussars

Honorary military appointments
British
 Honorary Colonel, 4th Regiment, Bengal Infantry
 Honorary Colonel, 4th Bombay Cavalry
 Honorary Colonel, 1st Punjab Cavalry
 Honorary Colonel, Third City of London Rifle Volunteer Corps (7th (City of London) Battalion, London Regiment) 1890–92

Arms
With his dukedom, Albert Victor was granted a coat of arms, being the royal arms of the United Kingdom, differenced by an inescutcheon of the arms of Saxony and a label of three points argent, the centre point bearing a cross gules.

Ancestry

Footnotes

References
 Aronson, Theo (1994). Prince Eddy and the Homosexual Underworld. London: John Murray. .
 Bradford, Sarah (1989). King George VI. London: Weidenfeld & Nicolson. .
 Cadbury, Deborah (2017). Queen Victoria's Matchmaking. London: Bloomsbury Publishing. .
 Cook, Andrew (2006). Prince Eddy: The King Britain Never Had. Stroud, Gloucestershire: Tempus Publishing Ltd. .
 Cornwell, Patricia (2003). Portrait of a Killer: Jack the Ripper Case Closed. London: Time Warner Paperbacks. .
 Duff, David (1980). Alexandra: Princess and Queen. London: Collins. .
 Harrison, Michael (1972). Clarence: The life of H.R.H. the Duke of Clarence and Avondale (1864–1892). London and New York: W. H. Allen. .
 Hyde, H. Montgomery (1970). The Other Love: An Historical and Contemporary Survey of Homosexuality in Britain. London: Heinemann. .
 Hyde, H. Montgomery (1976). The Cleveland Street Scandal. London: W. H. Allen. .
 Knight, Stephen (1976). Jack the Ripper: The Final Solution. New York: McKay. .
 Lees-Milne, James (1981). Harold Nicolson: A Biography. Volume 2: 1930–1968 London: Chatto & Windus. .
 Marriott, Trevor (2005). Jack the Ripper: The 21st Century Investigation. London: John Blake. .
 McDonald, Deborah (2007). The Prince, His Tutor and the Ripper. Jefferson, North Carolina: McFarland and Co. .
 Meikle, Denis (2002). Jack the Ripper: The Murders and the Movies. Richmond, Surrey: Reynolds and Hearn Ltd. .
 Neubecker, Ottfried (1976). Heraldry: sources, symbols and meaning. New York: McGraw-Hill. .
 Nicolson, Harold (1952). King George the Fifth: His Life and Reign. London: Constable.
 Pope-Hennessy, James (1959). Queen Mary: 1867–1953. London: George Allen and Unwin Ltd.
 Pope-Hennessy, James; Vickers, Hugo (ed.) (2018). The Quest For Queen Mary. London: Zulieka.
 Rumbelow, Donald (2004). The Complete Jack the Ripper: Fully Revised and Updated Penguin Books. .
 Van der Kiste, John (September 2004; online edition January 2008). "Albert Victor, Prince, duke of Clarence and Avondale (1864–1892)". Oxford Dictionary of National Biography, Oxford University Press. Accessed 1 May 2010. (Subscription required)

External  links 

 

1864 births
1892 deaths
Military personnel from Berkshire
19th-century British Army personnel
19th-century nobility
9th Queen's Royal Lancers officers
10th Royal Hussars officers
Alumni of Trinity College, Cambridge
Burials at St George's Chapel, Windsor Castle
Deaths from influenza
Deaths from pneumonia in England
English Anglicans
English people of Danish descent
House of Saxe-Coburg and Gotha (United Kingdom)
Infectious disease deaths in England
Jack the Ripper
King's Royal Rifle Corps officers
People from Windsor, Berkshire
People of the Victorian era
Dukes of Clarence
 Albert Victor
Princes of the United Kingdom
Freemasons of the United Grand Lodge of England
Knights of the Garter
Knights of St Patrick
Grand Crosses of the Order of Saint Stephen of Hungary
Grand Crosses of the Order of the Star of Romania
Recipients of the Order of the Netherlands Lion
Children of Edward VII
Sons of emperors
Sons of kings